Karankasso-Sambla is a department or commune of Houet Province in Burkina Faso.

Cities 
The department consists of a chief town :

 Karankasso-Sambla

and 13 villages:

 Banakorosso
 Bouende
 Diofoloma
 Gognon
Karankasso
 Kongolikan
 Koumbadougou
 Magafesso

 Sama-Toukouro
 Sembleni
 Sourougoudingan
 Tiara
 Torosso
 Toukoro Sambla.

References 

Departments of Burkina Faso
Houet Province